Simone Johanna Maria Simons (born 17 January 1985) is a Dutch singer. She is best known for being the lead singer of Dutch symphonic metal band Epica, which she joined at the age of seventeen, releasing eight studio albums and touring the world. In her singing career, she has also collaborated with bands such as Kamelot, Leaves' Eyes, Primal Fear, Ayreon, and Angra. She also has a side pursuit as a lifestyle blogger, via her website SmoonStyle.

Early life

Simons was born in Hoensbroek, Netherlands. She has a younger sister named Janneke who was born on Simone's second birthday. Simons cited her musical influences as Lacuna Coil, Nightwish, Tristania, Kamelot, Within Temptation, Dimmu Borgir, Tiamat, and some classical music such as Wolfgang Amadeus Mozart.

Simons started playing flute for two years after joining music school at the age of 12. At 14, she had one year of pop singing lessons, and at 15, she switched to classical singing after listening to Nightwish's Oceanborn, which remains her favorite Nightwish album. At one point she was invited to join in a rehearsal for a black metal band; she joined it, although was a little afraid to sing. Simons sang in a choir for a few months, and later joined Epica at the age of 17.

Epica

In early 2002, Mark Jansen left After Forever over creative differences. He then began looking for musicians who would work towards a more classical/symphonic type of music project; this was initially named "Sahara Dust". In late 2002, the band courted Helena Iren Michaelsen (from Trail of Tears) as its frontwoman, but shortly after she was replaced by the then unknown Simons, who was Jansen's girlfriend at the time.

Personal life
In January 2008, Simons was suffering from recurrent MRSA infections. This forced Epica to cancel many of their shows. In February, her condition improved, but she had not completely recovered. In March, Epica toured with Amanda Somerville, replacing Simons for their United States tour until 11 May 2008, when Simons performed again at their show in Bibelot, Dordrecht.

Asked about her looks as one of the factors that attract attention to Epica, Simons said: "First of all the most important is the sound of the band, because beauty will fade one day, and I hope my voice won't [Laughs]... But, yeah, you have two aspects of the band – the music (the CDs) and then the live side of it (the show), and part of the show is also that it has to look nice, so I take good care of myself, I make sure that the fans have something to look at during the show."

Simons and long-time partner, Kamelot keyboard player Oliver Palotai have a son, Vincent Palotai, born on 2 October 2013. In December 2013, Simons announced on her blog that she had recently married Palotai. They reside in Stuttgart, Germany. In the past, she had a relationship with Mark Jansen; the relationship ended in 2005, shortly after the release of Consign to Oblivion. Simons first met Jansen in the chatroom on After Forever's website, when Jansen was searching for a singer for a side project, with the then-16 year old Simons making a positive impression after singing to him over the phone during their first telephone conversation.

Simons runs a blog called "SmoonStyle", where she writes about her fashion, makeup, food and experiences she has had as a member of Epica, as well as in her personal life.

Discography

With Epica

Guest appearances
Aina – Days of Rising Doom (2003)
Kamelot – The Black Halo in "The Haunting (Somewhere in Time)" and appears in its video (2005)
Kamelot – One Cold Winter's Night in "The Haunting (Somewhere in Time)" (2006)
Kamelot – Ghost Opera in "Blücher" (2007)
Primal Fear – New Religion in "Everytime It Rains" (2007)
Ayreon – 01011001 in "Web of Lies" (2008)
Xystus & US Concert – Equilibrio in "Act 1 – My Song of Creation", "Act 2 – Destiny Unveiled" and "Act 2 – God of Symmetry" (2008)
Sons of Seasons – Gods of Vermin in "Fallen Family", "Fall Of Byzanz" and "Wintersmith" (2009)
Kamelot – Poetry for the Poisoned in "House on a Hill", "So Long", "All Is Over" (2010)
MaYaN – Quarterpast in "Symphony of Aggression", "Mainstay of Society", "Bite the Bullet", "Drown the Demon" and "Sinner's Last Retreat" (2011)
Sons of Seasons – Magnisphyricon in "Sanctuary" (2011)
Avalon – Angels of the Apocalypse (2014)
Angra – Secret Garden in "Secret Garden" (2014)
Countermove: The Power of Love (2014) Charity single for The Red Cross, originally by Frankie Goes to Hollywood
 Leaves' Eyes – King of Kings in "Edge of Steel" (2015)
 Ayreon – The Source as "The Counselor" (2017)
 Exit Eden – Rhapsodies in Black in "Frozen" and "Skyfall" (2017)
 Tarja Turunen – Feliz Navidad in "Feliz Navidad" (2017) Charity version to help raise funds for Barbuda for Hurricane Irma relief, originally by José Feliciano
Powerwolf – Sacred and Wild (2018)(with Epica). Featured on "The Sacrament of Sin (Deluxe Version)."
Ayreon – Electric Castle Live and Other Tales as "The Indian" (2020)
Ayreon – Transitus as "The Angel of Death" (2020)
Apocalyptica – Rise Again (2022)
Kamelot – The Awakening on "New Babylon" (2023)

Filmography 
 Soaring Highs and Brutal Lows: The Voices of Women in Metal as Herself (2015)

References

External links

Official website
Official blog

1985 births
Living people
Dutch heavy metal singers
Dutch singer-songwriters
Dutch sopranos
Dutch expatriates in Germany
Epica (band) members
Women heavy metal singers
English-language singers from the Netherlands
People from Heerlen
21st-century Dutch singers
21st-century Dutch women singers
Women in metal